The 2002–03 Alpha Ethniki was the 67th season of the highest football league of Greece. The season began on 24 August 2002 and ended on 25 May 2003. Olympiacos won their seventh consecutive and 32nd Greek title. Olympiacos and Panathinaikos finished the League with the same points total but Olympiacos were crowned champions due to more favourable results between the two teams. It was a very dramatic end to the season, with the decisive game between the two clubs taking place in the penultimate round. The season was interrupted by strike action after television broadcaster Alpha Digital collapsed in September 2002, following which the players didn't play for a month.

Teams

Stadia and personnel

 1 On final match day of the season, played on 25 May 2003.

League table

Results

Relegation play-off

Ionikos retained their spot in 2003–04 Alpha Ethniki. Apollon Kalamarias placed on 2003–04 Beta Ethniki

Top scorers
Source: Galanis Sports Data

References

External links
Greek Wikipedia
Official Greek FA site
Greek SuperLeague official site
SuperLeague Statistics

Alpha Ethniki seasons
Greece
1